The first book in the High School Musical series, was High School Musical: the Junior Novel, the novelization of the successful first film was released early June 2006, by Disney Press. This novel hit number one on the New York Times best-selling list best-selling list and remained on the list for sixteen weeks. As of August 2007, the novel has sold more than 4.5 million copies with 1 million copies of the novel's follow-up, High School Musical 2: The Junior Novel, being shipped to American retailers. Shortly after the success of the original novel, Disney announced that a book series, entitled Stories From East High, would be published in February 2007 with a new book being published every 60 days until July 2008. However, books from the series have been scheduled for publication after the originally announced date. A complete list of books is provided below:

List of books

Novels

The following are the novelizations of each individual film from the series.

Stories from East High

This book series is considered separate from the novelizations, although they do acknowledge events from the novels as well as from other books within the series.

Super Special Series
This series takes place in the same canon as the Stories from East High, but are roughly double the length of the other books.

References

High School Musical (franchise) mass media
Novels based on films
Novel series